The 1983 NCAA Division I Women's Tennis Championships were the second annual championships to determine the national champions of NCAA Division I women's singles, doubles, and team collegiate tennis in the United States.

The women's team championship was won by USC, their first title.  The Trojans defeated Trinity (TX) in the final round, 8–1. T

he women's singles title was won by Beth Herr from USC, and the women's doubles title was won by Louise Allen and Gretchen Rush from Trinity (TX).

Host site
This year's tournaments were hosted by the University of New Mexico at the Linda Estes Tennis Complex in Albuquerque, New Mexico. The men's and women's tournaments would not be held at the same site until 2006.

Team tournament

See also
NCAA Division II Tennis Championships (Men, Women)
NCAA Division III Tennis Championships (Men, Women)

References

External links
List of NCAA Women's Tennis Champions

NCAA Division I tennis championships
College women's tennis in the United States
NCAA Division I Women's Tennis Championships
NCAA Division I Women's Tennis Championships
NCAA Division I Women's Tennis Championships